Conselheiro Pena, formerly known as "Lajao", is located in the state of Minas Gerais, Brazil. This town of 20,000+ inhabitants, was formed alongside the "Rio Doce", or Sweet River.

References

Municipalities in Minas Gerais